Andra Liviana Moroianu (born 15 September 2000) is a Romanian handball player for Gloria Bistrița.

As a junior, she finished fifth in the 2019 Junior European Championship.

Individual awards 
 All-Star Right Wing of the Junior European Championship: 2019
 Romanian SuperCup 2020-2021

References
 

  
2000 births
Living people
Sportspeople from Constanța
Romanian female handball players